Events from the year 1817 in France.

Incumbents
 Monarch – Louis XVIII
 Prime Minister – Armand-Emmanuel de Vignerot du Plessis, Duc de Richelieu

Events
11 June - Concordat of 11 June 1817.

Births
2 January - François Chabas, egyptologist (died 1882)
3 February - Achille Ernest Oscar Joseph Delesse, geologist and mineralogist (died 1881)
15 February - Charles-François Daubigny, painter (died 1878)
24 February - Auguste-Alexandre Ducrot, general (died 1882)
6 March - Princess Clémentine of Orléans, youngest daughter of Louis-Philippe, King of the French (died 1907)
10 March - Claude Marie Dubuis, second Roman Catholic bishop of Texas (died 1895)
23 May - Gustave Thuret, botanist (died 1875)
31 May
Edouard Deldevez, violinist, conductor and composer (died 1897)
Joseph Marie Élisabeth Durocher, geologist (died 1860)
12 July - Paul-Quentin Desains, physicist (died 1885)
23 October - Pierre Larousse, grammarian and lexicographer (died 1875)
3 November - Ernest Hébert, painter (died 1908)
13 November - Louis James Alfred Lefébure-Wély, organist (died 1869)

Deaths
14 January - Pierre-Alexandre Monsigny, composer (born 1729)
4 April - André Masséna, Marshal of France (born 1758)
12 April - Charles Messier, astronomer (born 1730)
20 June - Marie-Gabriel-Florent-Auguste de Choiseul-Gouffier, diplomat and historian (born 1752)
14 July - Anne Louise Germaine de Staël, author (born 1766)
22 July - François-Philippe Charpentier, engraver and inventor (born 1734)
7 August - Pierre Samuel du Pont de Nemours, writer, economist and government official (born 1739)
4 October - Étienne-François Letourneur, lawyer, soldier and politician (born 1751)
27 December - Jean Baptiste Camille Canclaux, general (born 1740)

Full date unknown
Le Clerc Milfort, expedition leader and general (born 1752)

See also

References

1810s in France